In the systems of local government in some U.S. states, a general-law municipality, general-law city, code city, or statutory city is a municipality whose government structure and powers are defined by the general law of its state. This is in contrast to a charter city or home-rule city, whose government structure and powers are defined by a municipal charter.

States may allow only general-law municipalities, only charter municipalities, or both. In states having both, general-law municipalities generally have less autonomy than charter municipalities do. Six states do not allow municipal charters, meaning that every municipality is a general-law municipality. Other states may allow or require charters for all municipalities or may allow charters only for municipalities meeting certain criteria, requiring other municipalities to be general-law municipalities.

California

In California, a general-law city has only those powers expressly granted or necessarily incident to those expressly granted. Any fair, reasonable doubt is resolved against the exercise of such powers. A general-law city may have only a form of government authorized by state general law.

Michigan

In Michigan, villages can be general-law villages, governed under the General Law Village Act (Act 3 of 1895), or home-rule villages having charters.

Minnesota
In Minnesota, cities are either statutory cities or home rule charter cities. Statutory cities may select from three forms of organization, although one form is available only to statutory cities having populations above 1,000. Statutory cities are run according to rules laid down in Chapter 412 of the Minnesota Statutes.

Texas

In Texas, only cities of more than 5,000 inhabitants may become, upon voter approval of a city charter, home-rule cities; the rest must be general-law cities. General-law cities have only those powers that state law expressly or implicitly authorizes. By contrast, home-rule cities may assume any power not prohibited by the state constitution or state laws. General-law municipalities are classified by population as type A, B, or C, with different options for their forms of government.

Washington

In Washington (state), a code city is a city operating under the state's Optional Municipal Code rather than a charter.

References

Local government in the United States